Pontibacter roseus  is a Gram-negative bacterium from the genus of Pontibacter which has been isolated from muddy water from a drainage system in Chandigarh in India.

References

External links
Type strain of Pontibacter roseus at BacDive -  the Bacterial Diversity Metadatabase

Cytophagia
Bacteria described in 2006